Sennholz is a surname. Notable people with the surname include:

 Gustav Sennholz (1850−1895), German horticulturalist
 Hans Sennholz (1922–2007), German-American economist